Seabrook Crisps (often shortened to Seabrook's) is a UK brand of crisps produced in Bradford, England, by Seabrook Crisps Ltd.

History

The company was founded in 1945 by Charles Brook, and the name supposedly arose because of an error in a photo-processing shop; instead of writing "C. Brook" on a film, a clerk wrote "Seabrook". Original production was in Allerton, but in 1979-80 a larger factory opened in the Princeville area of Bradford; production continued at the Allerton factory until 2004. Seabrook's crisps are distributed widely in the north of England, and increasingly in the south, and are also sold through mail order.

Most of the potatoes used by the company are grown within 50 miles of the Bradford headquarters, Seabrook House. The crisps, sold in a variety of pack sizes, are salted with sea salt and are produced in a range of new and traditional flavours. The brand is best known for its bold flavours.

In 2017, Seabrook Crisps employed about 150 people, and was 75% owned by LDC (Lloyds Development Capital) and 25% by the management team: Jonathan Shuttleworth (CEO), Daniel Woodwards (COO), Jon Wood (commercial director) and Paul Monk (chairman).  The company turnover in 2017 was approximately £28 million per annum.

In October 2018, Seabrook Crisps was acquired by the UK subsidiary of Japanese snack company Calbee.

References

External links
Official web site
Entry on the BBC's h2g2 website

British snack foods
Brand name potato chips and crisps
Yorkshire cuisine